Ritual Groove Music is the debut album by Swiss pianist, composer, record producer and author r Nik Bärtsch's band Mobile recorded in Switzerland in 2000 and first released on the Tonus Music label in 2004.

Reception

The Allmusic review by Michael G. Nastos called it "A tip-of-the-iceberg recording, in the figurative and literal sense, one can speculate this is a mere beginning, almost child's play, for what Bärtsch and his crew have in store for the future of his compelling and singularly original music". On All About Jazz Budd Kopman noted "For the most part, the tracks sound spliced together, which only further enhances the trance-like effect the music can have. The album thus sounds like a show with terrific pacing, bringing the listener up and down by changing parameters such as overall pitch and speed of the figures".

Track listing
All compositions by Nik Bärtsch
 "Modul 5" – 8:56  
 "Modul 11" – 9:20  
 "Modul 4" – 3:53  
 "Modul 12" – 5:41  
 "Modul 4II" – 0:46  
 "Modul 2" – 7:07  
 "Modul 12II" – 8:02

Personnel
 Nik Bärtsch — piano, prepared piano
 Don Li – bass clarinet, alto saxophone
 Mats Eser – marimba, percussion
 Kaspar Rast – drums

References

Nik Bärtsch albums
2004 debut albums